Streamline Moderne is an international style of Art Deco architecture and design that emerged in the 1930s. Inspired by aerodynamic design, it emphasized curving forms, long horizontal lines, and sometimes nautical elements. In industrial design, it was used in railroad locomotives, telephones, toasters, buses, appliances, and other devices to give the impression of sleekness and modernity.

In France, it was called the style paquebot, or "ocean liner style", and was influenced by the design of the luxury ocean liner SS Normandie, launched in 1932.

Influences and origins

As the Great Depression of the 1930s progressed, Americans saw a new aspect of Art Deco, i.e., streamlining, a concept first conceived by industrial designers who stripped Art Deco design of its ornament in favor of the aerodynamic pure-line concept of motion and speed developed from scientific thinking. The cylindrical forms and long horizontal windowing in architecture may also have been influenced by constructivism, and by the New Objectivity artists, a movement connected to the German Werkbund. Examples of this style include the 1923 Mossehaus, the reconstruction of the corner of a Berlin office building in 1923 by Erich Mendelsohn and Richard Neutra. The Streamline Moderne was sometimes a reflection of austere economic times; sharp angles were replaced with simple, aerodynamic curves, and ornament was replaced with smooth concrete and glass.

The style was the first to incorporate electric light into architectural structure. In the first-class dining room of the SS Normandie, fitted out 1933–35, twelve tall pillars of Lalique glass, and 38 columns lit from within illuminated the room. The Strand Palace Hotel foyer (1930), preserved from demolition by the Victoria and Albert Museum during 1969, was one of the first uses of internally lit architectural glass, and coincidentally was the first Moderne interior preserved in a museum.

Architecture

Streamline Moderne appeared most often in buildings related to transportation and movement, such as bus and train stations, airport terminals, roadside cafes, and port buildings. It had characteristics common with modern architecture, including a horizontal orientation, rounded corners, the use of glass brick walls or porthole windows, flat roofs, chrome-plated hardware, and horizontal grooves or lines in the walls. They were frequently white or in subdued pastel colors.

An example of this style is the Aquatic Park Bathhouse in the Aquatic Park Historic District, in San Francisco. Built beginning in 1936 by the Works Progress Administration, it features the distinctive horizontal lines, classic rounded corners railing and windows of the style, resembling the elements of ship. The interior preserves much of the original decoration and detail, including murals by artist and color theoretician Hilaire Hiler. The architects were William Mooser Jr. and William Mooser III. It is now the administrative center of Aquatic Park Historic District.

The Normandie Hotel in San Juan, Puerto Rico, which opened during 1942, is built in the stylized shape of the ocean liner SS Normandie, and displays the ship's original sign. The Sterling Streamliner Diners in New England were diners designed like streamlined trains.

Although Streamline Moderne houses are less common than streamline commercial buildings, residences do exist. The Lydecker House in Los Angeles, built by Howard Lydecker, is an example of Streamline Moderne design in residential architecture. In tract development, elements of the style were sometimes used as a variation in postwar row housing in San Francisco's Sunset District.

"Paquebot" style

In France, the style was called Paquebot, meaning ocean liner. The French version was inspired by the launch of the ocean liner Normandie in 1935, which featured an Art Deco dining room with columns of Lalique crystal. Buildings using variants of the style appeared in Belgium and in Paris, notably in a building at 3 boulevard Victor in the 15th arrondissement, by the architect Pierre Patout. He was one of the founders of the Art Deco style. He designed the entrance to the Pavilion of a Collector at the 1925 Exposition of Decorative Arts, the birthplace of the style. He was also the designer of the interiors of three ocean liners, the Ile-de-France (1926), the L'Atlantique (1930), and the Normandie (1935). Patout's building on Avenue Victor lacked the curving lines of the American version of the style, but it had a narrow "bow" at one end, where the site was narrow, long balconies like the decks of a ship, and a row of projections like smokestacks on the roof. Another 1935 Paris apartment building at 1 Avenue Paul-Daumier in the 16th arrondissement had a series of terraces modelled after the decks of an ocean liner.

The Flagey Building was built on the Place Flagey in Ixelles (Brussels), Belgium, in 1938, in the paquebot style, and has been nicknamed "Packet Boat" or "paquebot". The building was extensively renovated, and in 2002, it reopened as a cultural centre known as Le Flagey.

Automobiles

The defining event for streamline moderne design in the United States was the 1933–34 Chicago World's Fair, which introduced the style to the general public. The new automobiles adapted the smooth lines of ocean liners and airships, giving the impression of efficiency, dynamism, and speed. The grills and windshields tilted backwards, cars sat lower and wider, and they featured smooth curves and horizontal speed lines. Examples include the 1934 Chrysler Airflow and the 1934 Studebaker Land Cruiser. The cars also featured new materials, including bakelite plastic, formica, Vitrolight opaque glass, stainless steel, and enamel, which gave the appearance of newness and sleekness.

Other later examples include the 1950 Nash Ambassador "Airflyte" sedan with its distinctive low fender lines, as well as Hudson's postwar cars, such as the Commodore, that "were distinctive streamliners—ponderous, massive automobiles with a style all their own".

Planes, boats and trains

Streamlining became a widespread design practice for aircraft, railroad locomotives, and ships.

Industrial design
Streamline style can be contrasted with functionalism, which was a leading design style in Europe at the same time. One reason for the simple designs in functionalism was to lower the production costs of the items, making them affordable to the large European working class. Streamlining and functionalism represent two different schools in modernistic industrial design.

Other notable examples

 1923 Mossehaus, Berlin. Reconstruction by Erich Mendelsohn and Richard Neutra
 1926: Long Beach Airport Main Terminal, Long Beach, California
 1928: Lockheed Vega, designed by John Knudsen Northrop, a six-passenger, single-engine aircraft used by Amelia Earhart
 1928: Doctor's Building in Kyiv, Ukraine
 1928–1930: Canada Permanent Trust Building in Toronto
 1930: Strand Palace Hotel, London; foyer designed by Oliver Percy Bernard
 1930–1934: Broadway Mansions, Shanghai, designed by B. Flazer of Palmer and Turner
 1931: The Eaton's Seventh Floor in Toronto, Ontario, Canada, designed by Jacques Carlu, in the former Eaton's department store
 1931: Napier, New Zealand, rebuilt in Art Deco and Streamline Moderne styles after a major earthquake
 1931–1932: Plärrer Automat, Nuremberg, Bavaria, Germany by later Nazi-collaborate architect Walter Brugmann
 1931–1933: Hamilton GO Centre, Hamilton, Ontario, Canada by Alfred T. Fellheimer
 1931–1944: Serralves House, Porto, Portugal, designed by José Marques da Silva
 1932: Edifício Columbus, São Paulo, Brazil (demolished 1971)
 1932: Arnos Grove Tube Station, London, England, designed by Charles Holden
 1933: Casa della Gioventù del Littorio, Rome, designed by Luigi Moretti
 1933: Ty Kodak building in Quimper, France, designed by Olier Mordrel
 1933: Southgate tube station, London
 1933: Burnham Beeches in Sherbrooke, Victoria, Australia. Harry Norris architect
 1933: Merle Norman Building, Santa Monica, California See also History of Santa Monica, California
 1933: Midland Hotel, Morecambe, England
 1933: Edificio Lapido, Montevideo, Uruguay
 1933–1940: Interior of Chicago's Museum of Science and Industry, designed by Alfred Shaw
 1934: Pioneer Zephyr, the first of Edward G. Budd's streamlined stainless-steel locomotives
 1934: Tatra 77, the first mass-market streamline automotive design
 1934: Chrysler Airflow, the second mass-market streamline automotive design
 1934: Hotel Shangri-La in Santa Monica, California
 1934: Edifício Nicolau Schiesser, São Paulo, Brazil (demolished 2014)
 1935: Ford Building in Balboa Park, San Diego, California
 1935: The De La Warr Pavilion, Bexhill-on-Sea, England
 1935: Pan-Pacific Auditorium, Los Angeles
 1935: Edificio Internacional de Capitalización, Mexico City, Mexico
 1935: The Hindenburg, Zeppelin passenger accommodations
 1935: The interior of Lansdowne House on Berkeley Square in Mayfair, London
 1935: The Hamilton Hydro-Electric System Building, Hamilton, Ontario, Canada
 1935: MV Kalakala, the world's first streamlined ferry
 1935: Technologist's Building in Kyiv, Ukraine
 1935–1938: Former Belgian National Institute of Radio Broadcasting (known as the Maison de la Radio) on Eugène Flagey Square in Ixelles (Brussels), by Joseph Diongre
 1935–1956: High Tower Court, Hollywood Heights, Los Angeles
 1936: Lasipalatsi, in Helsinki, Finland, functionalist office building and now a cultural and media center
 1936: Florin Court, on Charterhouse Square in London, built by Guy Morgan and Partners
 1936: Campana Factory, historic factory in Batavia, Illinois
 1936: Edifício Guarani, São Paulo, Brazil
 1936: Nordic Theater, Marquette, Michigan
 1936: Alkira House, Melbourne 
 1937: Earls Court Exhibition Centre, London
 1937: Earl's Court tube station, London, facing the Earls Court Exhibition frontage
 1937: Blytheville Greyhound Bus Station in Blytheville, Arkansas
 1937: Regent Court, residential apartments on Bradfield Road, Hillsborough, Sheffield
 1937: Malloch Building, residential apartments at 1360 Montgomery Street in San Francisco
 1937: B B Chemical Company, in Cambridge, Massachusetts, built by Coolidge, Shepley, Bulfinch & Abbott
 1937: Belgium Pavilion, at the Exposition Internationale, Paris
 1937: TAV Studios (Brenemen's Restaurant), Hollywood
 1937: Dudley Zoo, Dudley, UK
 1937: Hecht Company Warehouse in Washington, D.C.
 1937: Minerva (or Metro) Theatre and the Minerva Building, Potts Point, New South Wales, Australia
 1937: Bather's Building in the Aquatic Park Historic District, now the San Francisco Maritime National Historical Park Maritime Museum
 1937: Barnum Hall (High School auditorium), Santa Monica, California
 1937: J.W. Knapp Company Building (department store) Lansing, Michigan
 1937: Wan Chai Market, Wan Chai, Hong Kong
 1937: River Oaks Shopping Center, Houston
 1937: Toronto Stock Exchange Building, mix of Art Deco and Streamline Moderne
 1937: Pittsburgh Plate Glass Enamel Plant, in Milwaukee, Wisconsin, by Alexander C. Eschweiler
 1937: Old Greyhound Bus Station (Jackson, Mississippi)
 1937: Gramercy Theatre, New York City
 1937: Gdynia Maritime University in Poland, by Bohdan Damięcki
 1938: Esslinger Building in San Juan Capistrano, California
 1938: Fife Ice Arena in Kirkcaldy, United Kingdom
 1938: Mark Keppel High School, Alhambra, California
 1938: Greyhound Bus Terminal (Evansville, Indiana)
 1938: 20th Century Limited, New York City
 1938: Jones Dog & Cat Hospital, West Hollywood, California, by Wurdeman & Beckett (remodel of 1928 original construction)
 1938: Greyhound Bus Depot (Columbia, South Carolina)
 1938: Marine Court, St Leonards, East Sussex, England
 1939: Bartlesville High School, Bartlesville, Oklahoma
 1939: First Church of Deliverance in Chicago, Illinois
 1939: Marine Air Terminal, LaGuardia Airport, New York City
 1939: Road Island Diner, Oakley, Utah
 1939: Albion Hotel, South Beach, Miami Beach, Florida
 1939: New York World's Fair
 1939: Boots Court Motel in Carthage, Missouri
 1939: Cardozo Hotel, Ocean Drive, South Beach, Miami Beach, Florida
 1939: Daily Express Building, Manchester, England
 1939: East Finchley tube station, London, England
 1939: Appleby Lodge, Manchester, England
 1940: Gabel Kuro jukebox designed by Brooks Stevens
 1940: Ann Arbor Bus Depot, Michigan
 1940: Jai Alai Building, Taft Avenue Manila, Philippines (demolished 2000)
 1940: Hollywood Palladium, Los Angeles, California
 1940: Las Vegas Union Pacific Station, Las Vegas, Nevada
 1940: Rivoli Cinemas, 200 Camberwell Road Hawthorn East, Melbourne, Australia
 1940: Pacaembu Stadium, São Paulo, Brazil
 1941: Avalon Hotel, Ocean Drive, South Beach, Miami Beach, Florida
 1942: Coral Court Motel in Marlborough, Missouri
 1942: Normandie Hotel in San Juan, Puerto Rico
 1942: Mercantile National Bank Building in Dallas, Texas
 1942: Musick Memorial Radio Station in Auckland, New Zealand
 1943: Edifício Trussardi in São Paulo, Brazil
 1944: Huntridge Theater, Las Vegas, Nevada
 1945: Muscats Motors, Gżira, Malta
 1945: Ressano Garcia Railway Station, Mozambique
 1946: Gerry Building, Los Angeles, California
 1946: Canada Dry Bottling Plant, Silver Spring, Maryland
 1946: Broadway Theatre, Saskatoon, Saskatchewan, Canada
 1949: Sault Memorial Gardens, Sault Ste. Marie, Ontario
 1949: Beacon Lodge, Victoria, British Columbia, Canada
 1951: Federal Reserve Bank Building, Seattle, Washington
 1954: Poitiers Theater designed by Edouard Lardillier
 1955: Eight Forty One (former Prudential Life Insurance Building), Jacksonville, Florida, designed by KBJ Architects
 1957: Edinburgh Place Ferry Pier (Star Ferry Pier, Central), Hong Kong (demolished 2006)
 1957: Tsim Sha Tsui Ferry Pier, Hong Kong
 1965: Hung Hom Ferry Pier, Hong Kong
 1968: Wan Chai Pier, Hong Kong (demolished 2014)

In motion pictures 
Tanks, aircraft and buildings in William Cameron Menzies's 1936 movie Things to Come
The buildings in Frank Capra's 1937 movie Lost Horizon, designed by Stephen Goosson
The design of the "Emerald City" in the 1939 movie The Wizard of Oz
The main character's helmet and rocket pack in the 1991 movie The Rocketeer
The High Tower apartments, featured in the 1973 film The Long Goodbye and 1991 film Dead Again
The Malloch Apartment Building at 1360 Montgomery St, San Francisco that serves as apartment for Lauren Bacall's character in Dark Passage

See also 
 Century of Progress Chicago's second World's Fair (1933–34)
 Constructivist architecture
 Exposition Internationale des Arts et Techniques dans la Vie Moderne (1937) (1937 Paris Exposition)
 Googie architecture
 PWA Moderne – a Moderne style in the United States completed between 1933 and 1944 as part of relief projects sponsored by the Public Works Administration (PWA) and the Works Progress Administration (WPA)
 Raygun Gothic
 Streamliner

References

Bibliography

External links 

 Streamline Moderne, Flickr
 Streamline Moderne, Decopix
 "Streamline Moderne & Nautical Moderne Architecture in Miami Beach", Miami Beach Magazine
 "San Francisco 1939 Modern 'Wedding Cake'", HGTV.com

 
Streamliners
 Streamline Moderne
20th-century architectural styles